Tangoa, or Leon Tatagoa, is an Oceanic language spoken on Tangoa Island, south of Espiritu Santo Island in Vanuatu. The community was an early settlement for Christian missionaries, leading to its use as a lingua franca in the area, having largely displaced the moribund Araki language spoken on Araki Island.

Characteristics

Tangoa is one of the few languages of Vanuatu, and indeed of the world, possessing a set of linguolabial consonants.

References

Espiritu Santo languages
Languages of Vanuatu